The Victorian Vipers are a field hockey team who participate in Australia's national field hockey league, the AHL. The team is predominantly made up of amateurs who participate in the Victorian Premier League competition. The team's home stadium is the Victorian State Netball and Hockey Centre. Since the women's competition was included into the AHL in 1993, the Victorian Vipers have experienced varying levels of success including winning two national championships. These two championships came in the 2003 and 2012 competitions.

2014 Team

Laura Barden
Kristina Bates
Pauline Brugts
Kary Chau
Hannah Cohen
Laura Desmet
Hannah Gravenall
Stacia Joseph
Maud Lelkens (GK)
Rachel Lynch (GK)
Alana McQueen
Georgia Nanscawen
Lucy Ockenden
Hayley Padget
Meg Pearce
Danielle Schubach
Samantha Snow
Sophie Taylor

2013 Team

Rachael Lynch Goalkeeper

Alana Butler Goalkeeper

Megan Berriman  Defender

Carla Bond  Defender

Steph Doutre  Defender

Samantha Snow  Defender

Stacia Joseph  Midfield

Anna Burns  Midfield

Meg Pearce  Midfield

Kary Chau  Midfield

Hannah Cohen  Midfield

Claire Messent  Midfield

Hana Peake  Midfield

Danielle Schubach  Midfield

Hayley Padget  Midfield

Laura Barden  Striker

Laura Desmet  Striker

Stephanie Riordan  Striker

The team competed in Hobart, Tasmania from 28 September to 5 October 2013.

2013 Staff
Coach: Victor Romagosa

Assistant Coach: Katie Allen

Assistant Coach: Greg Drake

Team Manager: Natalie Joiner

Physiotherapist: Sharon Wilkins

Sports Scientist: Kylie Thomas

Strength and Conditioning: Nathan Heaney

2003 Team (National Champions)

Jessica Monkivich

Amanda Gillon

Rachel Imison (Aus - GK)

Fiona Allen (GK)

Justine Hiskins  

Joanne Grunden

Linda Harvey

Louise Dobson (Aus)

Ngaire Smith (Aus)

Tamsin Nelson

Emily Riordan

Kirsten Thompson

Leah Merrett

Renee Trost

Rebecca Eastman (Thompson)

Denise Duraski

Adele Brazenor

The team competed in the Australian Hockey league home & away style of championship and won the National Championship

2003 Staff
Coach: Toni Cumpston

Team Manager: Natalie Joiner

Notable players

Notable Victorian Vipers players which have represented the Hockeyroos at the Olympics include Louise Dobson, Rachel Imison and Georgia Nanscawen.

Previous coaches

John Mowat 1994-2001

Toni Cumpston 2001-08

Katie Allen 2009-12

Stadium

The team's home ground is the State Netball and Hockey Centre which is located within a kilometre of the Melbourne CBD. The stadium has a capacity of about 4,500 with 1000 seats however capacity is expanded through temporary seating for big tournaments. The stadium was used for the 2006 Commonwealth games, as well as the 2009 and 2012 Champions Trophy.

References

Australian field hockey clubs
Representative sports teams of Victoria (Australia)
Women's field hockey teams in Australia
Field hockey clubs established in 1993
1993 establishments in Australia
Sport in the City of Melbourne (LGA)